Cassata or cassata siciliana is a traditional cake from Sicily, Italy. Cassata consists of round sponge cake moistened with fruit juices or liqueur and layered with ricotta cheese and candied fruit, a filling also used with cannoli. Cassata has a shell of marzipan, pink and green coloured icing, and decorative designs. Cassata may also refer to a Neapolitan ice cream containing candied or dried fruit and nuts.

Origin 

Cassata is believed to have originated in Palermo in the 10th century, when under Muslim rule. The word  –  – was first mentioned in Corleone in 1178.

The Arabic word qas'ah, from which cassata may derive, refers to the bowl that is used to shape the cake. Historian John Dickie claims instead that the Sicilian word  did not derive from Arabic  ), as is often claimed, but from Latin . He observes that cassata did not signify a dessert until the late 17th century and did not take on its current striped form until the 18th century. Cassata, Dickie finds, "is the subject of an invented tradition based on the claim that its roots lie in the Muslim Middle Ages. Many other local food traditions purport to be as old."

Variations

Unlike the round, traditional shape some cassata are made in the form of a rectangle, square, or box. The word "box" in Italian is cassa, although it is unlikely that the word cassata originated from this term.

Cassata Catanese, as it is often prepared in the Sicilian province of Catania, is made similar to a pie, containing a top and bottom crust, filled with ricotta, and baked in the oven.

The Cassatella di sant'Agata (pl. cassatelle)—colloquially named Minni di Vergini, meaning "virgin breasts"—is a similar dessert, but made in a smaller, personal-serving size,  with a candied cherry on top, and often a specifically green-coloured marzipan. It is typically made in Catania for the festival of Saint Agatha. The allusion to the female breast relates the specific torture Saint Agatha faced as a Catholic martyr.

When a cassata is made, layers of gelato (Italian ice cream) can be substituted for the layers of cheese, producing a dessert similar to an ice cream cake. The version of the recipe followed in Messina is less sweet than the one used in Palermo.
"Cassata" can also refer to a flavor of ice-cream inspired by the sweet.

United States
In Cleveland, Ohio and the surrounding region, the term "Cassata Cake" uniquely refers to a layered yellow sponge cake soaked in rum or rum syrup, filled with fresh strawberries and custard, and usually decorated with whipped cream and sliced strawberries. 

This Cleveland version of the Cassata Cake first appeared in the early 1920s at LaPuma Spumoni & Bakery in Cleveland. The children of the owners did not like traditional cassata cake, made with sweetened ricotta and candied fruit. Using what he had in the bakery, Tomasso LaPuma created what was to become known as the Cleveland Cassata Cake. The fifth generation of this bakery, now located in the city's eastern suburb of Chesterland, still continues to make the original version of this cake, as do many other Italian bakeries in the area. The layered cake is served for special occasions such as weddings and large family events. Some local specialty bakers or restaurants, including several in Cleveland's Little Italy neighborhood, sell Cassata Cake by the slice or have adapted the cake to be sold with ingredients layered with in a jar to-go.

See also
Cannoli
Crema de fruta
Trifle
Tipsy cake

References

Italian cakes
Palermitan cuisine
Cuisine of Sicily
Italian desserts
Culture of Cleveland
Marzipan
Sponge cakes
Foods with alcoholic drinks
Dried fruit